Puteri Indonesia 2019, the 23rd Puteri Indonesia pageant, was held on March 8, 2019 (International Women's Day) at Jakarta Convention Center, Jakarta, Indonesia. Sonia Fergina Citra, Puteri Indonesia 2018 of Bangka Belitung, crowned her successor, Frederika Alexis Cull of Jakarta SCR 1, at the end of the event. She represented Indonesia at Miss Universe 2019, where she placed in the Top 10, the highest placement that an Indonesian representative ever achieved.

This edition also witnessed the crowning moment of other titleholders who would represent Indonesia at major international pageants. Jolene Marie Cholock Rotinsulu of North Sulawesi was crowned as Miss International Indonesia 2019 by the reigning Puteri Indonesia Lingkungan 2018, Vania Fitryanti Herlambang. She represented Indonesia at Miss International 2019. Jesica Fitriana Martasari of West Java was crowned as Miss Supranational Indonesia 2019 by the reigning Puteri Indonesia Pariwisata 2018, Wilda Octaviana Situngkir. She represented Indonesia at Miss Supranational 2019.

This year's pageant featured the 'Colorful West Nusa Tenggara' theme, as well as a series of Puteri Indonesia quarantine events being held on the island of Lombok and Sumbawa in West Nusa Tenggara. Contestants from 39 provinces participated this year.

The finale was attended by Miss Universe 2018, Catriona Gray of the Philippines, Miss International 2018, Mariem Velazco of Venezuela, and Miss Supranational 2018, Valeria Vázquez of Puerto Rico.

Judges 
Following the same appraisal system as Puteri Indonesia 2018, this year there were seven selection committee members, which consist of:
 Kusuma Dewi Sutanto – Jury President, Public Relation Puteri Indonesia Organization
 Mega Angkasa – Jury Secretary, Head of Public relation of Mustika Ratu, public Relation Puteri Indonesia Organization
 Kevin Lilliana – Miss International 2017 and Puteri Indonesia Lingkungan 2017 from Indonesia
 Jenny Kim – Miss Supranational 2017 from Korea
 Bambang Soesatyo – Chairperson of the People's Representative Council of the Republic of Indonesia
 Imam Nahrawi – Minister of Youth and Sports of the Republic of Indonesia
 Triawan Munaf – Chairperson of Department of Creative Economy & Industry of the Republic of Indonesia

Results

Main
The Puteri Indonesia 2019 Titleholders
 Puteri Indonesia 2019 (Miss Universe Indonesia 2019) 
 Puteri Indonesia Lingkungan 2019 (Miss International Indonesia 2019)
 Puteri Indonesia Pariwisata 2019 (Miss Supranational Indonesia 2019)

§ Voted into the Top 11 by Social medias and Fan-voting

Special Award

Puteri Indonesia Kepulauan
Puteri Indonesia Kepulauan is a title for the most Favorite Contestant that was chosen through votes from each group of Islands:

Candidates 
39 delegates competed in the pageant.

Crossovers Notes
Contestants who previously competed in other local beauty pageants or in international beauty pageants and reality modeling competition:

References

External links 

 Official Puteri Indonesia Official Website
 Official Miss Universe Official Website
 Miss International Official Website
 Official Miss Supranational Official Website

2019
Puteri Indonesia